The 2006 Aaron's 499 was the ninth race of the 2006 NASCAR Nextel Cup Series season. It was scheduled to be held on April 30, 2006 at the 2.6-mile long Talladega Superspeedway, but due to rain starting one lap prior to the green flag, however, the race was postponed until the following day. Television coverage was moved from Fox to FX except for several Fox stations that elected to carry the race. Elliott Sadler won the pole position, while Jimmie Johnson won the race. The Aaron's 499 was one of five impound races of the season, meaning that the teams could not make any changes on the car after qualifying.

Qualifying

Race results

Failed to qualify: Morgan Shepherd (No. 89), Stanton Barrett (No. 95), Mike Wallace (No. 09), Chad Blount (No. 92), Brent Sherman (No. 49), Kenny Wallace (No. 78)

References

Aaron's 499
Aaron's 499
NASCAR races at Talladega Superspeedway
May 2006 sports events in the United States